The 2014 Finnish Championship League competition is a Finnish domestic rugby union club competition operated by the Suomen Rugbyliitto.

Fixtures

Week 1

Week 2

Week 3

Week 4

Week 5

Week 6

Week 7

Week 8

Week 9

Week 10

Week 11

Week 12

Week 13

Week 14

Week 15

Week 16

Week 17

Playoffs

Semi-finals

Final

2014
rugby union
2013–14 in European rugby union leagues
2014–15 in European rugby union leagues